The Giro di Lombardia 1957, the 51st edition of the race, was held on October 20, 1957.

General classification

Final general classification

References

1957
1957 in road cycling
1957 in Italian sport
1957 Challenge Desgrange-Colombo